Epictia phenops is a species of snake in the family Leptotyphlopidae.

Distribution

E. phenops is found in El Salvador, Guatemala, Belize, Honduras, and southern Mexico.

Morphology

The species has a mean total length of 131.5 mm, though specimens can be as short as 53 mm, but as long as 195 mm.

References

Leptotyphlopidae
Reptiles described in 1875
Taxa named by Edward Drinker Cope